Edward Charles Feser (born April 16, 1968) is an American Catholic philosopher. He is an Associate Professor of Philosophy at Pasadena City College in Pasadena, California.

Education
Feser holds a Ph.D. in philosophy from the University of California at Santa Barbara, an M.A. in religion from the Claremont Graduate School, and a B.A. in philosophy and religious studies from the California State University at Fullerton. His thesis is titled "Russell, Hayek, and the Mind-Body Problem". He also went to Crespi High School in California.

Career
Feser is an associate professor of philosophy at Pasadena City College and has been a visiting assistant professor of philosophy at Loyola Marymount University and a visiting scholar at Bowling Green State University's Social Philosophy and Policy Center.

Called by National Review "one of the best contemporary writers on philosophy," Feser is the author of On Nozick, Philosophy of Mind, Locke, The Last Superstition: A Refutation of the New Atheism, Aquinas, Scholastic Metaphysics: A Contemporary Introduction, Neo-Scholastic Essay, and Five Proofs of the Existence of God, the co-author of By Man Shall His Blood Be Shed: A Catholic Defense of Capital Punishment, and the editor of The Cambridge Companion to Hayek and Aristotle on Method and Metaphysics. His primary academic research interests are in metaphysics, natural theology, the philosophy of mind, and moral and political philosophy.

Feser writes on politics and culture from a conservative point of view and on religion, from a traditional Roman Catholic perspective. His work has appeared in The American, The American Conservative, Catholic World Report, City Journal, The Claremont Review of Books, Crisis, First Things, Liberty, National Review, New Oxford Review, Nova et Vetera, Public Discourse, Reason, and TCS Daily. 

Feser's book The Last Superstition: A Refutation of the New Atheism makes a philosophical argument for the classical Aristotelian-Thomistic worldview over and against the materialist assumptions, which he sees as scientistic prejudices, of contemporary atheists such as Richard Dawkins, of whom he is particularly critical.

Personal life
Feser lives with his wife and six children in Los Angeles, California.

Bibliography

 On Nozick (Thomson-Wadsworth, 2003) 
 The Cambridge Companion to Hayek (Cambridge University Press, 2006) 
 Philosophy of Mind (A Beginner's Guide) (Oneworld Publications, 2007) 
 Locke (Oneworld Publications, 2007) 
 The Last Superstition: A Refutation of the New Atheism (St. Augustine's Press, 2008) 
 Aquinas (A Beginner's Guide) (Oneworld Publications, 2009) 
 Aristotle on Method and Metaphysics (as editor and contributor) (Palgrave Macmillan, 2013) 
 Scholastic Metaphysics: A Contemporary Introduction (Editiones Scholasticae, 2014) 
 Neo-Scholastic Essays (St. Augustine's Press, 2015) 
 By Man Shall His Blood Be Shed: A Catholic Defense of the Death Penalty (with Joseph M. Bessette) (Ignatius Press, 2017) 
 Five Proofs of the Existence of God (Ignatius Press, 2017) 
 Aristotle's Revenge: The Metaphysical Foundations of Physical and Biological Science (Editiones Scholasticae, 2019) 
 All One in Christ: A Catholic Critique of Racism and Critical Race Theory (Ignatius Press, 2022)

References

External links

 Official website
 Edward Feser's blog

Living people
1968 births
21st-century American philosophers
American philosophy academics
Pasadena City College faculty
University of California, Santa Barbara alumni
Critics of atheism
Converts to Roman Catholicism from atheism or agnosticism
Philosophers of religion
Catholic philosophers
Analytical Thomists
American male writers
Catholics from California
American traditionalist Catholics
Traditionalist Catholic writers
Analytic theologians